Max Graetz (1861-1936) was the President/CEO of the Ehrich & Graetz firm in Berlin. He was also the main inventor.

Between 1900-1916 he invented the Petromax lantern.

Ehrich & Graetz was a big metalworks firm until the Second World War.

See also
Kerosene lamp
Petromax

Further reading
 Ernst Quadt: Deutsche Industriepioniere. Berlin 1940.

External links
www.petromax.nl
Short History of Petromax and Graetz
Historical Lamp Forum

1861 births
1936 deaths
20th-century German inventors